Halfmoon Township is a township in Centre County, Pennsylvania, United States. It is part of the State College, Pennsylvania Metropolitan Statistical Area. The population was 2,819 at the 2020 census, which is a 5.4% increase since the 2010 census.

History
Half Moon was first settled in 1784 by Abraham Elder, who came from Franklin County. He found an abandoned cabin and stayed there for the summer. The following fall, Elder returned to his family in Franklin County, and they returned in the spring of 1785, along with Elder's brother, David.

The Abraham Elder Stone House and George Wilson Homestead are listed on the National Register of Historic Places.

Geography

Halfmoon Township is bordered by Taylor and Worth townships to the northwest, Patton Township to the northeast, Ferguson Township to the southeast and Huntingdon County to the southwest.

Demographics

As of the census of 2010, there were 2,667 people, 913 households, and 778 families residing in the township.  The population density was 118.0 people per square mile (66.3/km).  There were 963 housing units at an average density of 42.6/sq mi (16.4/km).  The racial makeup of the township was 97.3% White, 0.5% Black or African American, 0.8% Asian, and 1.4% from two or more races. Hispanic or Latino of any race were 1.1% of the population.

There were 913 households, out of which 44.1% had children under the age of 18 living with them, 79.1% were married couples living together, 2.3% had a male householder with no wife present, 3.8% had a female householder with no husband present, and 14.8% were non-families. 10.8% of all households were made up of individuals, and 3.1% had someone living alone who was 65 years of age or older.  The average household size was 2.92 and the average family size was 3.19.

In the township the population was spread out, with 28.4% under the age of 18, 5.8% from 18 to 24, 23.4% from 25 to 44, 35.7% from 45 to 64, and 6.7% who were 65 years of age or older.  The median age was 41 years. For every 100 females, there were 104.2 males.  For every 100 females age 18 and over, there were 102.0 males.

The median income for a household in the township was $98,911, and the median income for a family was $103,224.  The per capita income for the township was $36,018.  About 4.1% of families and 3.9% of the population were below the poverty line, including 2.5% of those under age 18 and none of those age 65 or over.

Neighborhoods 
Halfmoon Township includes fifteen different neighborhoods. These include Centennial Hills, Foxboro, Grahampton, Gummo Subdivision, Loveville, Oak Leaf, Orchard Creek, Orchard Manor, Sawmill Acres, Sedona Hills, Smith Development, Smith/Hughes, Stormstown, The Farm and Trotter Farm.

References

External links
Halfmoon Township official website

Populated places established in 1784
Townships in Centre County, Pennsylvania
Townships in Pennsylvania